Ubuntu was a vegetarian restaurant in Napa Valley, California which also operated a yoga studio. It opened in 2007, and closed in 2012. The New York Times listed it as one of the ten best new American restaurants.

References 

Defunct restaurants in the San Francisco Bay Area
Food and drink in the San Francisco Bay Area
2007 establishments in California
2012 disestablishments in California
Restaurants in California
Vegetarian restaurants in California